Hamazi or Khamazi (Sumerian: , ha-ma-ziki, or  Ḫa-ma-zi2ki) was an ancient kingdom or city-state of some importance that reached its peak c. 2500–2400 BC. Its exact location is unknown, but is thought to have been located in the western Zagros Mountains roughly between Elam and Assyria, possibly near Nuzi or modern Hamadan.

Hamazi first came to the attention of archaeologists with the discovery of a vase with an inscription in very archaic cuneiform commemorating the victory of Uhub (or Utug), an early king of Kish, over this place, causing fringe theorist Laurence Waddell in 1929 to speculate that it was to be identified with Carchemish in Syria. It is now generally considered to have been somewhere in the vicinity of the Diyala River.

One of the earliest references to Hamazi is found in the epic Enmerkar and the Lord of Aratta, where Enmerkar prays to Enki about the confusion of languages in the various inhabited lands, at the time of the building of the ziggurats in Eridu and Uruk. Hamazi is the only land mentioned in this prayer with the epithet "many-tongued". A sequel, Enmerkar and En-suhgir-ana also mentions that the sorcerer of Hamazi, Urgirinuna, went to Aratta after Hamazi "had been destroyed"; he is later sent by the Lord of Aratta on a failed mission attempting to bring Enmerkar into submission.

According to the Sumerian King List, king Hadanish of Hamazi held hegemony over Sumer after defeating Kish, but was in turn defeated by Enshakushanna of Uruk.

A clay tablet found in the archives at Ebla in Syria bears a copy of a diplomatic message sent from king Irkab-Damu of Ebla to king Zizi of Hamazi, along with a large quantity of wood, hailing him as a brother, and requesting him to send mercenaries in exchange.

Hamazi was one of the provinces of Ur under the reign of Amar-Sin during the Ur III period; two governors or ensis during this reign were named Lu-nanna son of Namhani, and Ur-Ishkur. In ca. 2010 BC, the province was occupied and plundered by Ishbi-Erra of Isin as the Ur III empire was collapsing.

History
The first dynasty of Hamazi to hold the hegemony over Sumer may have been founded  BC. This dynasty may have been defeated by the second dynasty of Uruk  BC (based on the SKL); however, the second of Ur may have destroyed Uruk  BC. This may have allowed the kingdom of Hamazi to seize this opportunity to temporarily regain its independence from Sumer. Hamazi was relatively peaceful up until  BC when the Neo-Sumerian Empire sent expeditions out into northwestern Iran. This third dynasty of Ur conquered Hamazi; but, this Sumerian dynasty was near its end amidst rebellions  BC. Poor upkeep over vassal states such as that of Hamazi may have resulted in the subsequent collapse of both kingdoms.

List of rulers of Hamazi

Notes

See also
Cities of the ancient Near East

Former populated places in Iraq
Former kingdoms
City-states
Ancient Near East